Eric Edelstein is an American actor and comedian. He is best known for playing the role of Bobby Mallison in Shameless, Chad in Clarence, B.O.B. in the Monsters vs. Aliens television adaptation, and Grizzly "Grizz" in We Bare Bears.

He also had a supporting role in the 2015 horror film Green Room, plays a paddock supervisor in Jurassic World,  and voiced the character Richard Brynn in the game Before Your Eyes.

Filmography

Film

Television

Video games

References

External links

Living people
20th-century American Jews
American male film actors
American male television actors
American male voice actors
Male actors from Maryland
21st-century American male actors
21st-century American Jews
Year of birth missing (living people)